Marwood may refer to:

People
 Marwood (surname)
 Benedictus Marwood Kelly (1785–1867), British Admiral who rose to prominence in the Napoleonic Wars 
 Edward Marwood-Elton, 1st Baronet (1800–1884), English barrister and peer 
 Marwood Munden (1885–1952), English doctor, war hero and cricketer

Places 
 Marwood, Devon, England
 Marwood, County Durham, England

Other uses
 Marwood baronets, of Little Bushby, created 1660
 The narrator of Withnail and I, called Marwood in the screenplay